Charles Richman may refer to:

 Charles Richman (commissioner), acting commissioner of the New Jersey Department of Community Affairs
 Charles Richman (actor) (1865–1940), American stage and film actor